Running Free is the fourth studio album by New Zealand rock band Dragon. It was produced by Peter Dawkins and was originally released in November 1977 on vinyl and re-released on CD in 1989. The album peaked at number 6 on the Australian Kent Music Report. The album was certified triple platinum in Australia.

Reception
Skip Jansen from AllMusic gave the album 3 out of 5 saying commented on the change of sound from previous records from the "verbose progressive rock sound into an equally lurid pub rock sound" adding "the album remain [a] timepieces of a dark and decadent era for New Zealand rock."

Track listing
"April Sun in Cuba (Marc Hunter, Paul Hewson) - 3:26
"Rose (M. Hunter, Robert Taylor, Todd Hunter) - 3:36
"Any Fool Can Tell You (P. Hewson) - 4:42
"Shooting Stars (P. Hewson) - 3:30
"Man Gone West (R. Taylor) - " 4:30
"Bob's Budgie Boogie (R. Taylor) - " 3:53
"Some Strange Dream" (T. Hunter) - 3:15
"Mr Thunder (M. Hunter) - " 3:50
"Since You Changed Your Mind (P. Hewson) - " 3:41
"Running Free" (M. Hunter, R. Taylor, T. Hunter) - 4:16

Charts

Certifications

Personnel 
 Bass – Todd Hunter
 Guitar – Robert Taylor
 Keyboards – Paul Hewson
 Lead Vocals – Marc Hunter
 Percussion – Kerry Jacobson
 Vocals – Paul Hewson, Robert Taylor, Todd Hunter

References 

Dragon (band) albums
1977 albums
CBS Records albums
Portrait Records albums
Rock albums by New Zealand artists
Albums produced by Peter Dawkins (musician)